Boz Qonj (also Romanized as Bozqūnj and Buzghunj) is a village in Alqurat Rural District, in the Central District of Birjand County, South Khorasan Province, Iran. At the 2006 census, its population was 185, in 57 families.

References 

Populated places in Birjand County